Marina de Rapel Airport,  is an airport  west of El Manzano (es), a lakeside town in the O'Higgins Region of Chile. El Manzano is on the northern arm of Lake Rapel.

There is rising terrain just south of the airport, and hills across the lake to the north. North approach and departure are over the water.

See also

Transport in Chile
List of airports in Chile

References

External links
OpenStreetMap - Marina de Rapel
OurAirports - Marina de Rapel
FallingRain - Marina de Rapel Airport

Marina Golf Rapel

Airports in Chile
Airports in O'Higgins Region